Pennsylvania held statewide elections on November 8, 2011, to fill judicial positions and allow judicial retention votes. The necessary primary elections were held on May 17, 2011.

Judge of the Superior Court

There was one vacancy to fill on the Superior Court of Pennsylvania. The seat being vacated is currently held by Robert A. Freedberg, who decided not to run in the election because he would face mandatory retirement due to his age in three years.

Primary campaign

Vic Stabile, a partner in a Harrisburg law firm, and Paula A. Patrick, a judge on the Philadelphia County Court of Common Pleas, faced off for the Republican nomination. Both candidates received a rating of "recommended" from the Pennsylvania Bar Association. Stabile won the endorsement of the Republican State Committee. The Pittsburgh Post-Gazette also endorsed Stabile for the Republican nomination. The Philadelphia Inquirer endorsed Patrick.

On the Democratic side, David N. Wecht, currently a judge on the Allegheny County Court of Common Pleas, was the only candidate to file; therefore he ran unopposed in the Democratic primary election. He received a rating of "highly recommended" from the Pennsylvania Bar Association.

The election was held on May 17, 2011. Stabile won the Republican primary, receiving 378,566 votes (65.3%) against Patrick's 200,856 (34.7%). Wecht received 605,665 votes (100.0%).

General election

Stabile and Wecht faced each other in the general election. Wecht was endorsed in the general election by The Philadelphia Inquirer and the Pittsburgh Post-Gazette, which both cited his judicial experience. Stabile was endorsed by The Patriot-News, which cited his "down-to-earth approach".

In the general election on November 8, Wecht won the seat with 1,029,560 votes (54.5%) against Stabile's 859,687 (45.5%).

Judge of the Commonwealth Court

There was one vacancy on the Commonwealth Court of Pennsylvania. The seat to be vacated is currently held by Johnny Butler, who decided not to run in the election.

Primary campaign

Anne Covey, a private attorney, and Paul P. Panepinto, a judge on the Philadelphia County Court of Common Pleas, contended for the Republican nomination. They received bar association ratings of "recommended" and "highly recommended", respectively. Covey won the endorsement of the Republican State Committee. Covey was also endorsed for the Republican nomination by both The Philadelphia Inquirer and the Pittsburgh Post-Gazette.

Kathryn Boockvar, an attorney who most recently worked for the Advancement Project and had previously spent 11 years in private practice, and Barbara Behrend Ernsberger, who has spent her career in private practice, competed for the Democratic nomination. Boockvar received a rating of "recommended" from the Pennsylvania Bar Association; Ernsberger received a rating of "not recommended" because she did not participate in the bar association evaluation process. Boockvar won the endorsement of the Democratic State Committee. The Philadelphia Inquirer and the Pittsburgh Post-Gazette also endorsed Boockvar for the Democratic nomination.

In the election on May 17, 2011, Covey received 406,764 votes (70.3%) and Panepinto received 171,996 (29.7%). The Democratic race was much closer: the initial results showed that Boockvar had received 311,624 votes (50.2%) and Ernsberger had received 309,508 (49.8%). Because the margin was less than half of a percent, these results triggered a recount, mandatory unless waived by the trailing candidate. Ernsberger declined to waive her right to a recount. On June 8, 2011, the Secretary of the Commonwealth announced that the recount had confirmed Boockvar's victory. The figures were nearly the same; in the final tally, Boockvar had 311,732 votes (50.2%) and Ernsberger had 309,680 (49.8%).

General election
Covey and Boockvar faced each other in the general election. Covey was endorsed in the general election by The Philadelphia Inquirer, which noted her "quasi-judicial experience of having served on the state's labor relations board". Boockvar was endorsed by the Pittsburgh Post-Gazette and The Patriot-News, which both praised her breadth of experience.

In the general election on November 8, Covey won with 978,634 votes (52.4%) against Boockvar's 890,701 (47.6%).

Retention elections

The following judges were up for retention in the 2011 general election:
Supreme Court judge Michael Eakin
Superior Court judge John T. Bender
Superior Court judge Mary Jane Bowes
Commonwealth Court judge Renée Cohn Jubelirer
Commonwealth Court judge Robert "Robin" Simpson
Commonwealth Court judge Mary Hannah Leavitt
The Pennsylvania Bar Association recommended retention of all six judges.

Eakin actively campaigned for retention, raising $526,000—more than any of the four candidates contending for the open seats on the Superior Court and the Commonwealth Court—and airing television advertisements.

In the general election on November 8, voters elected to retain all six judges. All the judges won their retention elections by a wide margin; each of them was favored for retention by over 70% of voters.

References

External links
Judgepedia: Pennsylvania judicial elections, 2011
Official candidate sites
Vic Stabile
Paula A. Patrick
David N. Wecht
Anne Covey
Paul P. Panepinto
Kathryn Boockvar
Barbara Behrend Ernsberger

 
Pennsylvania